The Islamic Republican Party (IRP; , also translated Islamic Republic Party) formed in 1979 to assist the Iranian Revolution and Ayatollah Khomeini establish theocracy in Iran. It was disbanded in 1987 due to internal conflicts.

Founders and characteristics 
The party was formed just two weeks following the revolution upon the request of Ayatollah Khomeini. Five cofounders of the party were Mohammad Javad Bahonar, Mohammad Beheshti, Akbar Hashemi Rafsanjani, Ali Khamenei, and Abdolkarim Mousavi-Ardabili. Early members of the central committee of the party, in addition to founding members, were Hassan Ayat, Asadollah Badamchiyan, Abdullah Jasbi, Mir Hossein Mousavi, Habibollah Askar Oladi, Sayyed Mahmoud Kashani, Mahdi Araghi and Ali Derakhshan. The party had three general secretaries: Beheshti, Bahonar and Khamenei.

The party has been said to be distinguished by "its strong clerical component, its loyalty to Khomeini, its strong animosity to the liberal political movements, and its tendency to support the revolutionary organizations," such as the komiteh.  Policies it supported included the state takeover of large capital enterprises, the establishment of an Islamic cultural and university system, and programs to assist the poor.

These revolutionary ayatollahs originally used the party to form a monopoly over the post-revolutionary theocratic Iranian state. In its struggle with civilian opponents the party made use of its ties to the Revolutionary Guards and Hezbollah.

Secretaries-general

Causes of its dissolution

In the late 1980s, factionalism in the IRP intensified, the major issues being the Iran-Iraq War, whether to open up to foreign countries or remain isolated, and economic policies. Because all rival parties had been banned, the party "did almost nothing and had little incentive to."

According to Ahmad Mneisi,
"While unanimous on the idea of a theological state and united under the umbrella of one party, the Islamic Republican Party (IRP), [the religious right] differed on a number of issues, such as the extent to which religion is to take hold of political life (the Velayat-e Faqih debate).

Daniel Brumberg argued that it was in response to the dispute between president Ali Khamenei and popular prime Minister Mir-Hossein Mousavi, that the IRP was dissolved - the Islamic Republican Party served "as a stronghold of radical activism," supporting Mousavi. However, another report states that it was dissolved in May 1987 due to internal conflicts. And the party was disbanded upon joint proposal of Rafsanjani and then party leader Khameini on 2 May 1987 when their proposal was endorsed by Ayatollah Khomeini.

1983 congress 
The party held its first congress in May 1983 and the members elected the 30-members central council as follows:

Allied organizations 
The following organizations formed an alliance with the party:
 Mojahedin of the Islamic Revolution Organization
 Islamic Coalition Party
 Combatant Clergy Association
 Worker House

Electoral history

Presidential elections

Parliamentary elections

See also 
 List of largest political parties

References

1979 establishments in Iran
Political parties established in 1979
1987 disestablishments in Iran
Political parties disestablished in 1987
Defunct political parties of the Islamic Republic of Iran
Political parties of the Iranian Revolution
Islamic political parties in Iran
Parties of one-party systems
Republican parties
Iranian clerical political groups
Anti-communist parties
Anti-imperialist organizations
Populism in Iran
Shia Islamic political parties
Khomeinist groups